The Suffolk Senior Cup is the second level football cup competition organised by the Suffolk FA after the Suffolk Premier Cup. It is currently open to Suffolk–based clubs competing in Eastern Counties League Division One and the top divisions of the Suffolk & Ipswich League, the Essex & Suffolk Border League, the Anglian Combination and the Cambridgeshire League.

History
The cup was first played during the 1885–86 season, and was initially known as the Suffolk Football Association Challenge Cup. During the 1899–90 season the competition was renamed Suffolk County Senior Cup when a Junior Cup was also introduced. In 1907 the Suffolk Football Association split, with one affiliating to the Football Association and the other to the Amateur Football Association, with both new organisations running a competition called the Suffolk Senior Cup. The AFA-affiliated organisation continued to use the original trophy, and the FA-affiliated one using a new trophy. The two reunited in 1914 when the AFA affiliated to the Football Association.

The competition was temporarily halted during World War I before it resumed in 1919, using the trophy that the FA-affiliated organisation had used. The original trophy was returned in 1921, with the newer trophy then being used for the Minor Cup competition. The Suffolk Senior Cup was interrupted again during World War II, resuming in 1945. In 1956 a new competition, the Suffolk Premier Cup was introduced for clubs in the Eastern Counties League and leagues above, with the Senior Cup becoming a secondary competition for clubs below the Eastern Counties League.

Past finals

References

External links
Suffolk Senior Cup Suffolk FA
Suffolk Senior Cup Football Club History Database

County Cup competitions
Football in Suffolk
Recurring events established in 1885